Tony Washington (born February 17, 1986) is a gridiron football offensive tackle who is currently a free agent. He most recently played for the Edmonton Elks of the Canadian Football League (CFL).

Early life 
On May 9, 2003, Washington pleaded guilty to prohibitive sexual conduct after having consensual sex with his sister, Caylen. At the time, he was 16, and she was 15. Washington was processed as an adult and put in jail; he was released after one month. As a result of the charge, he is a registered sex offender.

High school and college career 
Washington played one year of high school football as a junior while living in New Orleans. That year, he was awarded with all-league honors as a member of the Alcee Fortier High School football team. His family moved to Texas after Hurricane Katrina struck New Orleans. After graduating from high school, Washington did not plan to attend college. He decided to go to college, however, after a car salesman suggested he continue his football career. He then enrolled at Trinity Valley Community College in Athens, Texas. While at Trinity Valley, Washington was named to the 2007 all-Southwest Junior College Football Conference first team.

Washington then attended Abilene Christian University, playing on the football team for two years. Both years he was voted the Lone Star Conference Offensive Lineman of the Year.

Professional career 
Though Washington excelled at the NFL Scouting Combine workouts he was undrafted. He was very agile and quick for a lineman, running the 40-yard dash in 5.09 seconds. After leaving school, Washington played for the Dallas Vigilantes of the Arena Football League (AFL) for two years before signing with the Calgary Stampeders in 2011. He was signed by the Toronto Argonauts of the Canadian Football League on July 4, 2012, where he won his first Grey Cup.

Washington was traded to the Edmonton Eskimos from the Argos in May 2014. In his first three seasons in Edmonton he started in 48 games for the club, including the 2015 Grey Cup championship victory. Following the 2016 season Washington signed a contract extension with the Eskimos. He was released by Edmonton on August 7, 2017, and was immediately signed by the Hamilton Tiger-Cats.

On July 22, 2018, Washington was traded with teammate Landon Rice to the Montreal Alouettes in the blockbuster Johnny Manziel deal.

Washington re-signed with the Alouettes on a one-year contract extension on December 16, 2020.

The Edmonton Elks announced that they had traded for Washington on January 14, 2022. He was released on December 1, 2022.

References

External links
 Edmonton Eskimos bio 
 Toronto Argonauts bio

1986 births
Living people
Alcee Fortier High School alumni
Abilene Christian Wildcats football players
Allen Wranglers players
American football offensive linemen
American players of Canadian football
Calgary Stampeders players
Canadian football offensive linemen
Dallas Vigilantes players
Edmonton Elks players
Trinity Valley Cardinals football players
Players of American football from New Orleans
Players of Canadian football from New Orleans
Toronto Argonauts players
Hamilton Tiger-Cats players
People convicted of incest
Montreal Alouettes players